The Roman Catholic Church of the Sacred Heart is a Roman Catholic church on Knatchbull Road and Camberwell New Road in Camberwell, south east London, SE5.

The first church on this site was destroyed by enemy action during The Blitz between 8–9 October 1941.

The church was built between 1952 and 1958 in the Moderne style and has been listed Grade II on the National Heritage List for England since 2015. The foundation stone of the present church had been laid by Cyril Cowderoy on 19 April 1952.

The devotional Stations of the Cross sculptures of Sacred Heart were supplied by Burns & Oates and are placed above the side aisles of the church. The individual Stations of the Cross are made using the opus sectile technique, inlaid on a gold mosaic background.

References

External links

1872 establishments in England
1872 in London
20th-century Roman Catholic church buildings in the United Kingdom
Sacred Heart
Churches bombed by the Luftwaffe in London
Grade II listed buildings in the London Borough of Southwark
Grade II listed churches in London
Grade II listed Roman Catholic churches in England
Modernist architecture in London
Rebuilt churches in the United Kingdom
Roman Catholic churches completed in 1958
Roman Catholic churches in the London Borough of Southwark